David Farkash is an Israeli former footballer.

External links
  Profile and biography of David Farkash on Maccabi Haifa's official website

Living people
Israeli Jews
Israeli footballers
Maccabi Haifa F.C. players
Maccabi Haifa F.C. managers
Czechoslovak emigrants to Israel
Association footballers not categorized by position
Year of birth missing (living people)
Israeli football managers